The supraclavicular nerves (descending branches) arise from the third and fourth cervical nerves. They emerge beneath the posterior border of the sternocleidomastoideus (sternocleidomastoid muscle), and descend in the posterior triangle of the neck beneath the platysma muscle and the deep cervical fascia. Together, they innervate skin over the shoulder. The supraclavicular nerve can be blocked during shoulder surgery.

Branches
The supraclavicular nerves arise from C3 and C4 spinal nerve roots. Near the clavicle, the supraclavicular nerves perforate the fascia and the platysma muscle to become cutaneous. They are arranged, according to their position, into three groups—anterior, middle, and posterior.

Medial supraclavicular nerve
The medial supraclavicular nerves or anterior supraclavicular nerves (nn. supraclaviculares anteriores; suprasternal nerves) cross obliquely over the external jugular vein and the clavicular and sternal heads of the sternocleidomastoideus, and supply the skin as far as the middle line. They furnish one or two filaments to the sternoclavicular joint.

Intermedial supraclavicular nerve
The intermedial supraclavicular nerve middle supraclavicular nerves (nn. supraclaviculares medii; supraclavicular nerves) cross the clavicle, and supply the skin over the pectoralis major and deltoideus, communicating with the cutaneous branches of the upper intercostal nerves.

Lateral supraclavicular nerve 
The lateral supraclavicular nerve or posterior supraclavicular nerves(nn. supraclaviculares posteriores; supra-acromial nerves) pass obliquely across the outer surface of the trapezius and the acromion, and supply the skin of the upper and posterior parts of the shoulder.

Function 
The supraclavicular nerves together innervate the skin over the shoulder.

Clinical significance 
A supraclavicular nerve block is useful when performing surgery on the shoulder, anaesthetising a large area of skin.

The supraclavicular nerves are vulnerable during surgery on the clavicle, and must be identified early on in surgeries to reduce the risk of nerve injury and neuroma.

Additional images

References

External links
 

Nerves of the head and neck